Palazzo Pietro Spinola di San Luca is a 16th-century palace in Piazza di Pellicceria, Genoa, Italy. It is now a private residence, and it remains in good condition. It is one of the Palazzi dei Rolli, but it is not listed by UNESCO as World Heritage Site.

The building faces the Palazzo Spinola di Pellicceria, overlooking the square. The building was included in the rolli of 1588, 1599 and 1614. It still has a well-preserved 16th-century atrium and a grand staircase, part of which was reconstructed after being damaged by bombardment in World War II.

The palace's façade contains an ornate marble portal decorated by reliefs of vines and bunches of grapes, and topped by a sculpture of Saint George and the Dragon.

References

Palaces in Genoa
Palazzi dei Rolli
Spinola family
Houses completed in the 16th century
Renaissance architecture in Liguria